Terence Michael Frederick Smith (18 January 1934 – 7 December 2019) was a British statistician known for his research in survey sampling.

Fred Smith gained his first degree in 1959.

He succeeded Prof Maurice Quenouille as Professor of Statistics at the University of Southampton in 1975. He received the Guy Medal in bronze from the Royal Statistical Society in 1979. In 1983 he was elected as a Fellow of the American Statistical Association.

He was President of the Royal Statistical Society in 1991–1993.

Selected bibliography 
 
  (Portrait of T. M. F. Smith on page 144)

References 

Presidents of the Royal Statistical Society
Survey methodologists
British statisticians
Statistics educators
Academics of the University of Southampton
British social scientists
20th-century British mathematicians
21st-century British mathematicians
2019 deaths
1934 births
Fellows of the American Statistical Association